A list of animated television series first aired in 2006.

See also
 List of animated feature films of 2006
 List of Japanese animation television series of 2006

References

Television series
Animated series
2006
2006
2006-related lists